USS Leyte Gulf (CG-55) is a  guided missile cruiser in the United States Navy. She was named in memory of the World War II Battle of Leyte Gulf in the Pacific. She is powered by four large gas-turbine engines, and she has a large complement of guided missiles for air defense, attack of surface targets at sea and ashore, and anti-submarine warfare (ASW). In addition, she carries two "Seahawk" LAMPS multi-purpose helicopters, whose primary mission is ASW.

The incident occurred as the carrier, without prior warning, reversed her engines while Leyte Gulf was behind her and slammed into the cruiser's bow. There were no personnel casualties or injuries reported, and damage to the Leyte was only $2 million.

In 2002, she won the Marjorie Sterrett Battleship Fund Award for the Atlantic Fleet.

In late 1992 Leyte Gulf was assigned to Carrier Group 2. In March 2003 Leyte Gulf was assigned to Carrier Group Eight.

On 15 September 2007, there was a fire aboard Leyte Gulf as she underwent an extensive modernization program in BAE Systems Shipyard in Norfolk, Virginia. Initially the fire received national attention due to the possibility that it was a terrorist incident, however, it was quickly revealed to be an industrial accident. Five shipyard workers were injured in the incident, one seriously, but no naval personnel were involved.

In February 2011, Leyte Gulf was involved in an incident with Somali pirates after they captured the United States flagged yacht Quest.

The cruiser returned to Norfolk on 15 July 2011. During her deployment, she had participated in operations which had captured 75 Somali pirates and had missile strikes by her carrier strike group against the Libyan government.

In January 2015, Leyte Gulf returned from a six-month deployment to the Mediterranean Sea. The ship served as flagship of Standing NATO Maritime Group 2 for much of the deployment.

In August 2022 Leyte Gulf was again deployed to the Mediterranean Sea.

See also 
 Carrier Strike Group Two

References

Further reading

External links 
 
 

 

Ticonderoga-class cruisers
Ships built in Pascagoula, Mississippi
1986 ships
Cold War cruisers of the United States
Cruisers of the United States